Peyman Givi is a Persian-American rocket scientist and engineer.

Givi currently serves as a Distinguished Professor of Mechanical Engineering and Materials Science and the James T. McLeod Professor at University of Pittsburgh, and previously a Distinguished Professor of Aerospace Engineering at State University of New York along with being an Elected Fellow of the American Association for the Advancement of Science, American Institute of Aeronautics and Astronautics, American Physical Society and ASME.

His research interests are fluid-thermal systems, combustion, turbulence, computational methods, Quantum computing, and stochastic processes.

Biography

Givi is from Iran, and now lives in Pittsburgh. He received his bachelor's degree in mechanical engineering from the Youngstown State University in 1980 and his master's and Ph.D. in mechanical engineering from Carnegie Mellon University in 1982 and 1984, respectively. Prior to joining University of Pittsburgh in 2002, he held the rank of University Distinguished Professor in Aerospace Engineering at the State University of New York at Buffalo, where he received the Professor of the Year Award by Tau Beta Pi (2002). He also worked as a Research Scientist at the Flow Industries, Inc. in Seattle.

Research
He was the first scientist who introduced the concept of filtered density function for accurate prediction of turbulent combustion.

Awards and honors
Givi received the NASA's Public Service Medal (2005). He is amongst the first 15 engineering faculty nationwide who received the White House Presidential Faculty Fellowship from President George Bush. He also received the Young Investigator Award of the Office of Naval Research, and the Presidential Young Investigator Award of the National Science Foundation. Givi has achieved Fellow status in AAAS, AIAA, APS, and ASME; and was designated as Engineer of the Year for 2007 by the Pittsburgh chapter of the ASME.

References

External links

Date of birth missing (living people)
Living people
University of Pittsburgh faculty
State University of New York faculty
American materials scientists
Carnegie Mellon University alumni
Youngstown State University alumni
Year of birth missing (living people)
Fellows of the American Physical Society